The Maysilo Circle, is a roundabout in Mandaluyong, Metro Manila, the Philippines. It is located a few kilometers from Mandaluyong's border with Makati, just across the Pasig River through San Francisco Street. The roundabout serves as a junction point between the northern and southern sections of Boni Avenue, F. Martinez Avenue, San Francisco Street, and Sgt. Bumatay Street in the southern part of the city.

It is the government center of the city of Mandaluyong. Inside the circle are important government buildings, such as the old and new buildings of the Mandaluyong city hall complex, the main office of the Mandaluyong City Fire Department, the Mandaluyong Postal Office, the Mandaluyong Hall of Justice, the Barangay Plainview Operations Center, as well as recreational and religious places such as the Amado T. Reyes Park and the Archdiocesan Shrine of Divine Mercy.

History 

The roundabout was first envisioned as part of a municipal center for the Plainview residential development of Ortigas, Madrigal and Company (now Ortigas and Company). After the development and the circle was transferred to the government, the area became known as the Barangay Plainview.

The project became infamous for closing off San Francisco Street to traffic and for causing severe flooding even without the rains. Allegations of corruption were also raised due to the slow progress of the project, which was still not yet finished after two years of construction. The DPWH in February 2016 stated that the project was on schedule to be finished by May 2016. The street was reopened to the public on October 25, 2016, after the completion of the project.

References

Landmarks in the Philippines
Roundabouts and traffic circles in the Philippines
Roads in Metro Manila
Mandaluyong